Joseph Julian "Monk" Harrington (February 18, 1919 – September 10, 2008) was a member of the North Carolina Senate from 1963 to 1988, representing the 1st District. During his last two terms in office (January 1985 – December 1988), Harrington, a Democrat, served as President pro tempore. He retired from the legislature in 1988 and was succeeded by Frank Ballance.

A lifelong resident of Bertie County, North Carolina, Harrington served in the United States Army during World War II. After playing minor league baseball, he returned home to work for the family farm implements manufacturing business. Before being elected to the legislature, he was a Lewiston town commissioner and a member of Lewiston-Woodville Local School Board. Harrington also served as a trustee of both Chowan College and Elizabeth City State College.

A bridge over the Roanoke River is named for him.

References

Obituary in News & Observer
"Former state senator dies", News & Observer, Sept. 11, 2008
Passing scene: 'The hub and the bub' in Raleigh by Jack Betts
North Carolina Manual

1919 births
2008 deaths
Democratic Party North Carolina state senators
Minor league baseball players
Chowan University
Elizabeth City State University trustees
People from Bertie County, North Carolina
United States Army personnel of World War II
20th-century American politicians
United States Army soldiers
20th-century American academics